John Stewart Walker,  (born 5 September 1974) is a disabled British archer. He won the 2 gold medals in the men's W1 individual compound and the mixed team compound W1 at the 2016 Summer Paralympics in Rio de Janeiro. He was appointed Member of the Order of the British Empire (MBE) in the 2017 New Year Honours for services to archery.

Following a motorcycle accident in 2011, Walker sustained spinal cord injuries that left him with a partially paralysed right arm and multiple injuries. As a result, Walker uses a wheelchair.

Walker retired from archery in 2019 following a shoulder injury.

References 

English male archers
Paralympic archers of Great Britain
Archers at the 2016 Summer Paralympics
Paralympic gold medalists for Great Britain
1974 births
Living people
Medalists at the 2016 Summer Paralympics
Members of the Order of the British Empire
Paralympic medalists in archery